Prestoea is a genus of palms native to the Caribbean, Central and South America.  Its range extends from Nicaragua and the Greater Antilles in the north to Brazil and Bolivia in the south.

 Prestoea acuminata (Willd.) H.E.Moore - Central America (Costa Rica, Nicaragua, Panama), West Indies, northwestern South America (Colombia, Venezuela, Ecuador, Peru, Bolivia)
 Prestoea carderi (W.Bull) Hook.f. - Colombia, Venezuela, Ecuador, Peru
 Prestoea decurrens H.E.Moore - Costa Rica, Nicaragua, Panama, Colombia, Ecuador
 Prestoea ensiformis  (Ruiz & Pav.) H.E.Moore - Costa Rica, Peru, Panama, Colombia, Ecuador
 Prestoea longipetiolata (Oerst.) H.E.Moore - Costa Rica, Nicaragua, Panama, Colombia, Venezuela
 Prestoea montana (Graham) G.Nicholson; (Willd.) H.E. Moore - Greater and Lesser Antilles
 Prestoea pubens  H.E.Moore - Panama, Colombia
 Prestoea pubigera  (Griseb. & H.Wendl.) Hook.f. - Venezuela, Trinidad
 Prestoea schultzeana  (Burret) H.E.Moore - Costa Rica, Nicaragua, Panama, Colombia, Ecuador. Peru, Brazil
 Prestoea simplicifolia Galeano - Antioquia region of Colombia
 Prestoea tenuiramosa  (Dammer) H.E.Moore - Venezuela, Guyana, Brazil

References

 
Trees of the Caribbean
Trees of Central America
Trees of South America
Arecaceae genera
Neotropical realm flora